Morley Winograd is an American author and speaker. He serves as a Senior Fellow at the University of Southern California’s Annenberg School’s Center on Communication Leadership and Policy. Michael D. Hais is a Principal of Mike & Morley and the co-author of "Millennial Momentum: How A New Generation Is Remaking America" (Rutgers University Press: 2011) and "Millennial Makeover: MySpace, YouTube, and the Future of American Politics" (Rutgers University Press: 2008). He is also a fellow with NDN, a Democratic think tank.

He was appointed as the Senior Policy Advisor to Vice President Al Gore. and Director of the National Partnership for Reinventing Government  in December 1997. Winograd left his post in January, 2001 to return to Southern California.

Winograd served as Chairman of the Michigan Democratic Party from 1973 to 1980. In 1988, Winograd also chaired Al Gore's presidential primary campaign in Michigan. As a member of the Democratic Leadership Council, in 1991, Winograd served as Parliamentarian at the National Convention in Cleveland, Ohio.

In 1996, together with Dudley Buffa, he helped co-found the Institute for the New California (INC), a think tank devoted to aligning that state's governing systems with requirements for the information age. Winograd is co-author with Buffa of Taking Control: Politics in the Information Age (published in 1996). Taking Control analyzes the political ramifications that technology has on the way Americans live, work and govern themselves.

Winograd began his career in 1979 in the telecommunications industry with the Michigan Bell company. He was responsible for propelling the success of small business customers in the Western region as the Sales Vice President for AT&T's Western Region Commercial Markets. Winograd is also responsible for the creation of the AT&T University of Sales Excellence Program. This sales program won national recognition in Peter Block's book, Stewardship (1993), as well as Stan Davis and Jim Botkin's book, The Monster Under the Bed (1994).

Winograd resides in Southern California.

Education
Winograd graduated from the University of Michigan with a Bachelor's Degree in Business Administration.

References

References
Fast Company. (1996).  How knowledge workers vote. Retrieved February 8, 2006, from 
http://www.fastcompany.com/magazine/05/vote.html

Living people
California Democrats
Al Gore
Ross School of Business alumni
Year of birth missing (living people)